Banca di Credito Popolare S.C.p.A. (BCP) is an Italian cooperative bank based in Torre del Greco, in Metropolitan City of Naples, Campania. Most of the revenue of the bank came from the Metropolitan City of Naples, which the bank had 44 branches in the metropolitan city.

History
Società Anonima Cooperativa di Credito Popolare was found on 19 April 1888. The bank absorbed Banca Popolare Cooperativa del Matese in 1968. In 1971 the bank acquired the residual assets of Banca Popolare di Secondigliano. From 1999 to 2003 the bank absorbed Banca di Credito Cooperativo di Nusco, Partenio and Cervino e Durazzano.

The bank owned a minority interests in ISVEIMER, which was sold to Banco di Napoli in 1993. The bank also sold its 0.116% stake in Istituto Centrale delle Banche Popolari Italiane in 2015.

See also
 Banco di Napoli
 Banca della Campania

References

External links
 

Cooperative banks of Italy
Italian companies established in 1888
Banks established in 1888
Companies based in Campania
Torre del Greco